William Michael Cosgrove (November 26, 1916 – December 11, 1992) was an American prelate of the Roman Catholic Church. He served as bishop of the Diocese of Belleville in Illinois from 1976 to 1981.  He previously served as an auxiliary bishop of the Diocese of Cleveland in Ohio from September 3, 1968 to October 28, 1976.

Biography

Early life 
Cosgrove was born on November 26, 1916, in Canton, Ohio. He attended Saint Ignatius High School in Cleveland and John Carroll University in University Heights, Ohio. Cosgrove was ordained to the priesthood for the Diocese of Cleveland by Archbishop Edward Francis Hoban on December 18, 1943.

Episcopy 
On June 12, 1968, Cosgrove was appointed as an auxiliary bishop of the Diocese of Cleveland and titular tishop of Trisipa by Pope Paul VI. He received his episcopal consecration on September 3, 1968, from Bishop Clarence Issenmann with bishops John Whealon and Harold Perry as co-consecrators.

Cosgrove was named the fourth bishop of the Diocese of Belleville on August 30, 1976 by Pope John Paul II. Cosgrove was installed on October 28, 1976.  The author  Michael Gallagher described Cosgrove as a man of deep social concern who was popular with both clergy and laity.

On May 19, 1981, Pope John Paul accepted Cosgrove's resignation as bishop of the Diocese of Belleville.  William Cosgrove died on December 11, 1992 at age 76. The Bishop William M. Cosgrove Center in Cleveland is named after him.

References

1916 births
1992 deaths
John Carroll University alumni
People from Canton, Ohio
Roman Catholic Diocese of Cleveland
20th-century Roman Catholic bishops in the United States
Roman Catholic bishops of Belleville
Catholics from Ohio